Macaca majori, commonly known as the dwarf macaque, is a prehistoric macaque from the Early Pleistocene of Sardinia, Italy.

References

M
Prehistoric monkeys
Pleistocene mammals of Europe
Pleistocene primates
Fossil taxa described in 1946